In aerial warfare, the term overclaiming describes a combatant (or group) that claims the destruction of more enemy aircraft than actually achieved. The net effect is that the actual losses and claimed victories are unequal.

Overclaiming by individuals can occur when more than one person attacks the same target and each claims its destruction, when an aircraft appears to be no longer in a flying condition but manages to land safely, or when an individual simply wishes to claim unjustified credit for downing an opponent. In some instances of combat over friendly territory a damaged aircraft may have been claimed as an aerial victory by its opponent while the aircraft was later salvaged and restored to an operational status. In this situation the loss may not appear in the records while the claim remains confirmed.

Separate to problems with confirmation, overclaiming can also occur for political or propaganda reasons. It was common for both sides to inflate figures for "kills" or deflate figures for losses in broadcasts and news reports. Overclaiming during World War II has been the centre of much scrutiny, partly because of the significant amount of air combat relative to other conflicts.

German methodology for confirming aerial victories 
The Luftwaffes aerial victory confirmation procedure was based on directive 55270/41 named "Confirmation of aerial victories, destructions and sinking of ships" and was issued by the Oberbefehlshaber der Luftwaffe (Luftwaffe high command). This directive was first issued in 1939 and was updated several times during World War II. 

In theory the German approval process for the confirmation of aerial victories was very stringent and required a witness. The final destruction or explosion of an enemy aircraft in the air, or bail-out of the pilot from the aircraft, had to be observed on gun-camera film or by at least one other human witness. The witness could be the German pilot's wingman, another in the squadron, or an observer on the ground. If a pilot reported shooting down an aircraft without this confirmation it was considered only a "probable" and did not count in the victory scoring process.

During the 1990s, the German archives were made available to the public in the form of microfilm rolls of wartime records that had not been seen since January 1945.
The records show that, although the Luftwaffe generally did not accept a "kill" without a witness, some pilots habitually submitted unwitnessed claims and sometimes these made it through the verification process, particularly if they were made by pilots with established records.
Unlike all of the other air forces that fought during World War II, the Luftwaffe did not accept shared claims, but sometimes it happened. Each claim should have referred to a particular aircraft, but some victories were awarded to other pilots who had claimed the destruction of the same aircraft.
From mid-year 1943 through 1944, the Wehrmachtbericht (communiques from the head of the armed forces) often overstated Allied bomber losses by a factor of up to two; these claims existed only in the communiques and were not used in victory scoring. 

Defenders of the German fighter pilots maintain that overclaims were eliminated during the confirmation process, but the microfilms show that this was not always the case. Stringent reviews and comparisons of Allied archives and German archives show that 90 percent of the claims submitted were confirmed, or found to be "in order" for confirmation, up to the time the system broke down altogether in 1945.

Examples of overclaiming

References

Citations

Bibliography

 Bergström, Christer (2007). Barbarossa – The Air Battle: July–December 1941. London: Chevron/Ian Allan. .
 Bergstrom, Christer (2007). Stalingrad – The Air Battle: November 1942 – February 1943. London: Chevron/Ian Allan.  .
 Bergström, Christer (2007). Kursk – The Air Battle: July 1943. London: Chevron/Ian Allan. .
 Bergström, Christer (2015). The Battle of Britain: An Epic Conflict Revisited" London: Casemate Books. 
 Brown, Russell (2000). Desert Warriors: Australian P-40 Pilots at War in the Middle East and North Africa, 1941–1943. Maryborough, Queensland, Australia: Banner Books. .
 Bungay, Stephen (2000). The Most Dangerous Enemy: a History of the Battle of Britain. 
 Caldwell, Donald & Muller, Richard (2007). The Luftwaffe over Germany: Defense of the Reich. London: Greenhill Books. 
 Hess, William N. (1994). B-17 Flying Fortress: Combat and Development History. St. Paul, Minnesota: Motorbook International. 
 Hinchcliffe, Peter. The Other Battle: Luftwaffe Night Aces vs Bomber Command. London: Zenith Press, 1996. .
 Horvath, Daniel & Gabor. Verified Victories: Top JG 52 Aces Over Hungary 1944–45. England: Helion & Company, 2022. .
 
 Manrho, John, Putz, Ron. Bodenplatte: The Luftwaffe's Last HopeThe Attack on Allied Airfields, New Year's Day 1945. Ottringham, United Kingdom: Hikoki Publications, 2004. 
 Peart, Alan. "From North Africa to the Arakan". Grub Street Publishing, 2008. 
 Prien, Jochen & Rodeike, Peter & Stemmer, Gerhard (1998). Messerschmidt Bf 109 im Einsatz bei Stab und I./Jagdgeschwader 27 1939–1945. struve-druck, Eutin. 
 Iván, Pataki – László, Rozsos – Gyula, Sárhidai: Légi háború Magyarország felett. Második kötet. Budapest: Zrínyi Kiadó, 1988. 
 Spick, Mike (1996). Luftwaffe Fighter Aces. New York: Ivy Books. .
 Shores, Christopher (2005) Air War for Burma. London: Grub Street .
 Thomas, Andrew. Griffon Spitfire Aces. London: Oxford. 
 Tillman, Barrett. Wildcat: The F4F in WW II.  Annapolis: Naval Institute Press (1990).  
 Ward, John. (2004). Hitler's Stuka Squadrons: The Ju 87 at war, 1936–1945. Eagles of War. London. 
 Weal, John (2006). Bf 109 Defence of the Reich Aces. Oxford: Osprey. 
 Weal, John. Messerschmitt Bf 110 Zerstörer Aces World War Two. London: Osprey, 1999. .

Military aviation